The 2005 Campionati Internazionali di Sicilia was a men's tennis tournaments played on outdoor clay courts in Palermo, Italy that was part of the International Series of the 2005 ATP Tour. It was the 27th edition of the tournament and was held from 26 September until 2 October 2005. Unseeded Igor Andreev won the singles title.

Finals

Singles
 Igor Andreev defeated  Filippo Volandri 0–6, 6–1, 6–3
 It was Andreev's 2nd singles title of the year and of his career.

Doubles
 Martín García /  Mariano Hood defeated  Mariusz Fyrstenberg /  Marcin Matkowski 6–2, 6–3

References

External links
 ITF tournament edition details

Campionati Internazionali di Sicilia
Campionati Internazionali di Sicilia
Campionati Internazionali di Sicilia